Zee Bangla is an Indian general entertainment pay television channel broadcasting in the Bengali language. It is owned by the Zee Entertainment Enterprises.

History 
The channel was relaunched on 15 September 1999 as Alpha TV Bangla, along with Alpha TV Marathi, Alpha TV Telugu and Alpha TV Punjabi. 
It was the first Bengali-language satellite television channel in India.
 
On 19 June 2011, all Zee channels rebranded with a new logo which was like number two instead of alphabet Z.

In 2019, Samrat Ghosh became the head of the channel.
The channel's new graphics was revealed during Sa Re Ga Ma Pa on 7 October 2018. In February 2020, it was one of the largest Bengali-language television channels in India by viewership.

On 30 September 2021, Bangladesh imposed a blackout on foreign television channels, including Zee Bangla, that broadcast commercials. Two weeks later, Zee Bangla resumed broadcasting in Bangladesh, albeit without the commercials.

Notable programs

Drama series

Acquired series

Reality shows

Notable former broadcasts

Drama series 

Aamar Durga (2016-2017)
Agnipariksha (2009-2014)
Alo Chhaya (2019-2021)
Amloki (2018)
Andarmahal (2017-2018)
Bagh Bondi Khela (2020)
Bhanumotir Khel (2018-2019)
Bhootu (2016-2017)
Bibi Chowdhurani (2014)
Bikele Bhorer Phool (2017)
Bodhisattwor Bodhbuddhi (2022)
Bokul Kotha (2017-2020)
Boyei Gelo (2013-2014)
Chaddobeshi (2017)
Chokher Bali (2015-2016)
Deep Jwele Jaai (2015-2017)
Dwiragaman (2014-2016)
Ei Chheleta Bhelbheleta (2016-2017)
Ei Poth Jodi Na Sesh Hoy (2021-2022)
Ek Akasher Niche (2000-2005)
Ekdin Pratidin (2005-2007)
Esho Maa Lakshmi (2015-2016)
Goyenda Ginni (2015-2016)
Hriday Haran B.A. Pass (2018-2020)
Jamai Raja (2017-2018)
Jamuna Dhaki (2020-2022)
Jarowar Jhumko (2016-2017)
Jibon Saathi (2020-2022)
Joy Baba Loknath (2018-2020)
Joyee (2017-2019)
Kache Aye Shoi (2013-2014)
Kadambini (2020)
Kanakanjali (2011-2012)
Karunamoyee Rani Rashmoni (2017-2022)
Khirer Putul (2020)
Ki Kore Bolbo Tomay (2019-2021)
Kojagori (2015-2016)
Konya (2011)
Kori Khela (2021-2022)
Krishnakoli (2018-2022)
Laalkuthi (2022)
Lokkhi Kakima Superstar (2022-2023)
Neel Simana (2004-2007)
Netaji (2019-2020)
Nokshi Kantha (2018-2020)
Paanch Dine Gappo
Pandab Goenda (2020-2021)
Phirki (2020-2021)
Phoolmoni (2016-2017)
Pilu (2022)
Pratibimba
Premer Phaande (2016)
Raadha (2016-2017)
Raage Anuraage (2013-2015)
Raashi (2011-2015)
Rajjotok (2014-2016)
Rangiye Diye Jao (2017-2018)
Ranu Pelo Lottery (2018-2019)
Rimli (2021)
Saat Bhai Champa (2017-2019)
Saat Paake Bandha (2010-2013)
Sarbojaya (2021-2022)
Seemarekha (2017-2019)
Soudaminir Sansar (2019-2021)
Stree (2016-2018)
Subarnalata (2010-2012)
Trinayani (2019-2020)
Tumi Robe Nirobe (2014-2016)
Uma (2021-2022)
Uron Tubri (2022)

Reality shows 

Apur Sansar
Dadagiri Unlimited
Dance Bangla Dance
Ke Hobe Biggest Fan
Mirakkel
Rannaghor
Sa Re Ga Ma Pa Bangla

References

External links 

Television stations in Kolkata
Bengali-language television channels in India
1999 establishments in West Bengal
Zee Entertainment Enterprises
Television channels and stations established in 1999